Radhika Tulpule (born 9 February 1982) is an Indian former professional tennis player.

Tulpule has a career-high singles ranking by the WTA of 473, achieved on 17 September 2001. She also has a career-high WTA doubles ranking of 438, attained on 14 April 2003. In her career, Tulpule won six singles and six doubles titles on the ITF Women's Circuit.

Playing for India Fed Cup team, she has a win–loss record of 1–0.

ITF finals

Singles (6–0)

Doubles (6–5)

Fed Cup participation

Doubles

References

External links
 
 
 

1982 births
Living people
Indian female tennis players
Sportspeople from Pune